Michael MacDonald may refer to:

Politics
 Michael D. MacDonald, member of the Michigan Senate
 Michael James MacDonald (1909–1997), union leader and politician in Nova Scotia
 Michael L. MacDonald (born 1955), Canadian politician
 Michael Patrick MacDonald (born 1966), Irish-American activist against crime and violence
 Michael MacDonald (Green Party candidate)

Sports
 Mike MacDonald (basketball), American basketball coach
 Mike MacDonald (rugby union) (born 1980), rugby union footballer
 Mike Macdonald (American football) (born c. 1987), defensive coordinator of the Baltimore Ravens

Other
 Mike MacDonald (comedian) (1954–2018), Canadian comedian and actor
 Mike MacDonald (photographer) (born 1960), American nature photographer
 J. Michael MacDonald, Chief Justice of Nova Scotia
 Michael C. A. Macdonald, specialist in the languages of ancient Syria, Jordan and Arabia

See also
Michael McDonald (disambiguation)